Ernst Wagner-Hohenlobbese (15 January 1866 – 29 March 1935) was a German sports shooter. He competed in the 1000 yard free rifle event at the 1908 Summer Olympics.

References

1866 births
1935 deaths
German male sport shooters
Olympic shooters of Germany
Shooters at the 1908 Summer Olympics
Place of birth missing